Mahanta is a genus of moths in the family Limacodidae.

Species
Mahanta fraterna  Solovyev, 2005
Mahanta kawadai  Yoshimoto, 1995 (Taiwan)
Mahanta leworthyi  Holloway, 1986 (Brunei)
Mahanta quadrilinea  Moore, 1879 (India)
Mahanta svetlanae  Solovyev, 2005 (Thailand)
Mahanta tanyae  Solovyev, 2005 (China)
Mahanta yoshimotoi  Wang & Huang, 2003 (China)
Mahanta zolotuhini  Solovyev, 2005

References
Moore, 1879 , in Hewitson & Moore. Descr. new Ind. Lep. Coll. Atkinson (1) : 78.

External links
boldsystems.org: species images

Limacodidae genera
Limacodidae
Taxa named by Frederic Moore